Rockland Historic District is a national historic district at Brooklandville, Baltimore County, Maryland, United States. It is located at the intersection of Old Court Road and Falls Road, where Old Court turns into Ruxton Road.  There are 15 buildings in the area, including a general store, tavern, the shell of a blacksmith shop, a carriage house, several log buildings, a group of stone rowhouses, the Rockland Grist Mill, and an 18th-century dwelling.  It is one of the surviving examples of a small, quiet, sylvan community of the early 19th century.

Rockland Grist Mill dates to at least 1810, and has been used for a variety of purposes, including manufacture of calico, cotton spinning, production of wooden toys and artificial silk, food preservation additives and jewelry cleaning solutions.

The area was added to the National Register of Historic Places in 1973, and underwent restoration in 1982.

References

External links
, including photo from 2006, at Maryland Historical Trust
Boundary Map of the Rockland Historic District, Baltimore County, at Maryland Historical Trust

Brooklandville, Maryland
Historic districts in Baltimore County, Maryland
Federal architecture in Maryland
Historic districts on the National Register of Historic Places in Maryland
National Register of Historic Places in Baltimore County, Maryland